The Montreal Jazz were a Canadian professional basketball team based in Montreal, Quebec, Canada. The team played its only season in the National Basketball League of Canada in the 2012-2013 season, in place of the Laval Kebs. The Jazz played its home games at the Centre Pierre Charbonneau.

The Jazz did not play in the 2013-14 NBL Canada season after failing to secure a new ownership group.

History
On October 26, 2012 NBL Canada announced that a Montreal expansion team would join the league in place of the recently folded Laval Kebs.

It was announced on November 1, 2012 that the team would be named the Montreal Jazz.

After finishing the 2012-13 NBL Canada season with a disappointing 2-38 record and without an owner, the NBL Canada Board of Governors decided to suspend the Jazz for the 2013-14 season.

2012-13 Roster

Injured reserve

Only season record

References

External links
 

Defunct National Basketball League of Canada teams
Basketball teams established in 2012
2012 establishments in Quebec
Basketball teams disestablished in 2013
2013 disestablishments in Quebec
Basketball teams in Montreal